Tony Mitchell (born August 7, 1989) is an American professional basketball player for Al-Muharraq SC of the Bahraini Premier League. He played college basketball for the University of Alabama.

High school career
As a junior at Swainsboro High School, Mitchell averaged 19 points, eight rebounds and five blocked shots. For his effort, he was named the 2007 Georgia Sports Writers Association Class AA Player of the Year and was voted all-state. He averaged 27 points, eight rebounds and five assists per game his senior year and lead his team to a 2008 regional title. Coming out of high school, Mitchell was rated as a four-star prospect and the #10 overall small forward by Scout.com and a four-star player and the #8 overall small forward by Rivals.com.

College career
In June 2007, Mitchell committed to then head coach Mark Gottfried and the University of Alabama over the University of South Carolina and the University of Cincinnati. His enrollment with Alabama was delayed, however, due to academic issues and he was unable to join the team for the 2008–09 season. He instead played one season with Central Park Christian, a preparatory school in Birmingham, Alabama.

At Central Park, Mitchell led the team to a 25–0 record and a National Christian Education Basketball Tournament title. Despite Coach Gottfried being relieved of his duties at Alabama in January 2009, Mitchell maintained his commitment and joined the team and new coach Anthony Grant for the 2009–10 season.

As a freshman, Mitchell averaged over 23 minutes per game and made 18 starts for the (17–15) Crimson Tide. In just his second game, he scored 23 points on 10-14 shooting against Jackson State. On the season, he averaged 9.2 points and 5.9 rebounds and recorded three double-doubles including a 10-point, 12-rebound effort against Kentucky in the SEC Tournament. He was named as an SEC Freshman of the Week, Alabama's Most Outstanding Freshman and a member of the SEC All-Freshman Team.

In his sophomore season for the 2010–11 team, Mitchell led the team in scoring, rebounds, steals and minutes played. On February 21, he was named the SEC Player of the Week after he averaged 20 points and 6.5 rebounds in wins at LSU and over Arkansas. Against Arkansas, Mitchell scored a career-high 27 points on 11 of 15 shooting. He was second team All-SEC. After being suspended for conduct detrimental to the team, he was granted his release from the 2011–12 Alabama Crimson Tide men's basketball team.

Professional career
After going undrafted in the 2012 NBA draft, Mitchell joined the Sacramento Kings for the 2012 NBA Summer League. In November 2012, he was acquired by the Fort Wayne Mad Ants. In March 2013, he won the 2013 D-League Dream Factory Dunk Contest. On April 16, 2013, he was named the 2013 NBA D-League Rookie of the Year. He was a two-time NBA D-League Performer of the Week and March’s NBA D-League Co-Player of the Month.

In May 2013, he joined the Talk 'N Text Tropang Texters for the 2013 Commissioner's Cup.

In July 2013, he joined the Boston Celtics for the Orlando Summer League and the New York Knicks for the Las Vegas Summer League. In October 2013, he signed with the Jilin Northeast Tigers of China for the 2013–14 season. In December 2013, he left Jilin after 11 games. On January 8, 2014, he was re-acquired by the Fort Wayne Mad Ants.

On March 4, 2014, he signed a 10-day contract with the Milwaukee Bucks. On March 14, 2014, he was not offered a second 10-day contract by the Bucks. Two days later, he was re-acquired by the Mad Ants. He went on to help the Mad Ants win the 2014 NBA D-League championship.

In July 2014, he joined the NBA D-League Select Team for the 2014 NBA Summer League. 

On August 18, 2014, he signed with Dolomiti Energia Trento of the Italian Serie A for the 2014–15 season. After leading the league in scoring with 20.1 points per game (adding 5.6 rebounds and 2.8 assists) over 34 games, he was named Serie A MVP.

On September 3, 2015, he joined Russian club Krasny Oktyabr to play in both the regional VTB United League and continental Eurocup. On November 3, 2015, he parted ways with Krasny Oktyabr after averaging 21.4 points per game. On November 23, 2015, he signed with the Spanish club Estudiantes for the rest of the 2015–16 ACB season. On December 28, 2015, he parted ways with Estudiantes after appearing in six games. On January 8, 2016, he signed with the Italian club Dinamo Sassari for the rest of the season. On May 2, 2016, he parted ways with Sassari. On May 31, 2016, he signed in China with the Hebei Xianglan for the 2016 NBL season.

On November 15, 2016, Mitchell signed with Israeli club Hapoel Eilat. He left Hapoel after appearing in five games.

On January 20, 2017, Mitchell signed with the Cairns Taipans for the rest of the 2016–17 NBL season. On February 24, 2017, Mitchell was banned for the entire 2017–18 NBL season for throwing the ball at a referee after the Taipans' semi-final loss to the Perth Wildcats four days earlier.

On May 29, 2017, Mitchell signed with the Indios de Mayagüez of Puerto Rico for the rest of the 2017 BSN season.

On October 12, 2017, Mitchell signed a training camp contract with the Miami Heat. He was waived on October 14 as one of the team’s final preseason roster cuts. Nine days later, he was acquired by the Sioux Falls Skyforce of the NBA G League.

On April 18, 2018, Mitchell signed with Santeros de Aguada of the Baloncesto Superior Nacional. However, he was released on May 18 after 10 games.

On August 20, 2018, Mitchell came back to Italy and signed a deal with Pallacanestro Cantù of the LBA.

On February 28, 2019, he has signed contract with OriOra Pistoia of the Italian Lega Basket Serie A (LBA).

In February 2020, Mitchell signed with AS Salé in Morocco.

On October 1, 2021, Mitchell has signed with TaiwanBeer HeroBears of the T1 League.

References

External links

Tony Mitchell at nba.com
Tony Mitchell at legabasket.it 
Eurobasket.com Profile
Tony Mitchell at rolltide.com

1989 births
Living people
Alabama Crimson Tide men's basketball players
American expatriate basketball people in Australia
American expatriate basketball people in China
American expatriate basketball people in Israel
American expatriate basketball people in Italy
American expatriate basketball people in the Philippines
American expatriate basketball people in Russia
American expatriate basketball people in Spain
American men's basketball players
Aquila Basket Trento players
Basketball players from Georgia (U.S. state)
BC Krasny Oktyabr players
Cairns Taipans players
CB Estudiantes players
Dinamo Sassari players
Fort Wayne Mad Ants players
Hapoel Eilat basketball players
Jilin Northeast Tigers players
Lega Basket Serie A players
Liga ACB players
Milwaukee Bucks players
Pallacanestro Cantù players
People from Swainsboro, Georgia
Philippine Basketball Association imports
Pistoia Basket 2000 players
Santeros de Aguada basketball players
Sioux Falls Skyforce players
Small forwards
TNT Tropang Giga players
Undrafted National Basketball Association players
American expatriate basketball people in Taiwan
TaiwanBeer HeroBears players
T1 League imports
AS Salé (basketball) players